Gardênia Santos Ribeiro Gonçalves (born April 1, 1937 in Floriano, Piauí) is a Brazilian politician. She served as mayor of São Luís, from 1986 to 1989. Gonçalves was the spouse of João Castelo. During the 1980s when she was mayor, 15,000 employees lost their jobs.

References

See also
 List of mayors of São Luís, Maranhão

Brazilian Social Democracy Party politicians
Progressistas politicians
Democratic Social Party politicians
1937 births
Living people
People from Piauí

Candidates for Vice President of Brazil